Microlophus bivittatus, the San Cristóbal lava lizard, is a species of lava lizard endemic to San Cristóbal Island in the Galápagos Islands. The species is commonly attributed to the genus Microlophus but has been attributed to the genus Tropidurus. They are currently under threat by invasive cats on the island. The lizard is also closely related to the Microlophus occipitalis which radiated off of the bivittatus.

Reproduction 
Lava lizards have a breeding ritual where males will compete via head bobbing to avoid physical conflict. Research has found that head bobbing achieves a greater response when the response is immediate as compared to a 30-second delay. Larger males will receive greater aggression from other males and greater assertive responses from females. There is no current data that supports ecological competition is higher between same sex individuals however.

References 

bivittatus
Endemic reptiles of the Galápagos Islands
Lizards of South America
Reptiles of Ecuador
Reptiles described in 1871
Taxa named by Wilhelm Peters